Matinee Ladies was a 1927 American silent comedy film produced and distributed by Warner Bros. Directed by Byron Haskin, the film starred May McAvoy and was Haskin's first directorial effort after having been a cinematographer. Matinee Ladies is now considered lost.

Cast

References

External links
 
 

1927 films
1927 comedy films
Silent American comedy films
American silent feature films
American black-and-white films
Films directed by Byron Haskin
Lost American films
Warner Bros. films
Films with screenplays by Sidney Buchman
1927 directorial debut films
1927 lost films
Lost comedy films
1920s American films